Iceland Airwaves is a music festival annually held in early November in Reykjavík, Iceland.

The festival spans four days (Wednesday - Saturday) and its main focus is showcasing new music, both Icelandic and international. The festival's main sponsors are Icelandair and the City of Reykjavík.

Festival
The first show was held in 1999 as a one-off event in an airplane hangar at Reykjavík Airport.

Iceland Airwaves is promoted and produced by Iceland Music Export and is sponsored by its founder Icelandair, in cooperation with the City of Reykjavik.

In February 2018 the event managing company Sena Live, a subsidiary of production company Sena, bought the logo and all associated trademarks of Iceland Airwaves Music Festival. The 2018 edition of Iceland Airwaves was promoted and produced by Sena Live.

Notable acts

See also
List of electronic music festivals

References

External links

Iceland Airwaves

Music festivals in Iceland
Festivals in Reykjavík
Electronic music festivals in Iceland
Annual events in Iceland
1999 establishments in Iceland
Music festivals established in 1999
Rock festivals in Iceland
Icelandair
Autumn events in Iceland